Monica Witni (born May 6, 1930) is an American composer, pianist, playwright, and double bass player who was born in Fairfax, Minnesota. She began piano lessons at age six and studied with Jose Eschniz. She received scholarships to play double bass at Southern Illinois University and Millikin University in Decatur, Illinois. Monica taught briefly and played double bass in a jazz trio and with the Milwaukee Symphony Orchestra. She married James Cassin in 1953, and published music under the names Monica Witni, Monica Witni Cassin, and under the pseudonym Mirriam Bowden Henningfeld.

Her compositions include:

Ballet 
Zarea and the Purple Rainbow (1968)

Chamber 
Dimensions in Rhythm (viola)
March, Fantasia, and Fugue (organ)
Modal Etude (viola; 1948)
String Quartet in e minor (1969)
Summer Holiday (viola)
Sweet One (viola)
Twilight Serenade (viola)

Electronic 
Tapestry (English horn, harp, celeste, vibraphone, and double bass)

Musical theatre 
Wizard (1964)

Opera 
Children of the Sun (three acts; 1975)
Dark of Summer (one act; 1967)
El Pope (one act; 1950)

Orchestra 
Organ Concerto in c minor (1948)
Piano Concerto in f minor
Rhapsody Petite (oboe and string orchestra)
Symphony #1 (1947)
Symphony #2 (1956)
Symphony #5
Tambores Subsurrantes
Viola Concerto in c minor

Play 
Black Camellia
One of Us is Missing

Song 
"I've Got to Face the Future" (with Jack Gould)

References 

Women opera composers
American contemporary classical composers
Classical double-bassists
1930 births
Possibly living people
Pseudonyms
String quartet composers
American opera composers
People from Minnesota
Southern Illinois University alumni